Henry I. Gourley (October 3, 1838 – May 27, 1899) was Mayor of Pittsburgh from 1890 to 1893

Early life
Henry Irvin Gourley was born in Juniata County, Pennsylvania in 1838 to a peasant family.  Because of his families inability to support themselves he was sent early in life to a farm in Pine Township, Pennsylvania in Allegheny County, where he displayed a great work ethic and eventually became a school teacher.

Pittsburgh politics
In 1876 he was elected to the City Council. Mayor Gourley took office in 1890 and his reputation for hard and honest work served him well in city hall.  His term was noted for the trust it engendered in Pittsburgh residents.  After he left office he served as city controller before his death in 1899 He is buried in Homewood Cemetery.

References

1838 births
1899 deaths
Mayors of Pittsburgh
Pennsylvania city council members
Burials at Homewood Cemetery
19th-century American politicians